William Mayes may refer to:
William Mayes (cricketer) (1885–1946), English cricketer
William Edward Mayes (1861–1952), English painter
William Harding Mayes (1861–1939), American journalist

See also
William Mayes Fry (1896–1992), Royal Air Force fighter ace
William Mays (disambiguation)
William May (disambiguation)
Billy Mays (disambiguation)
Mayes (surname)